In mathematics and abstract algebra, a Boolean domain is a set consisting of exactly two elements whose interpretations include false and true. In logic, mathematics and theoretical computer science, a Boolean domain is usually written as {0, 1}, or 

The algebraic structure that naturally builds on a Boolean domain is the Boolean algebra with two elements. The initial object in the category of bounded lattices is a Boolean domain.

In computer science, a Boolean variable is a variable that takes values in some Boolean domain. Some programming languages feature reserved words or symbols for the elements of the Boolean domain, for example false and true. However, many programming languages do not have a Boolean datatype in the strict sense. In C or BASIC, for example, falsity is represented by the number 0 and truth is represented by the number 1 or −1, and all variables that can take these values can also take any other numerical values.

Generalizations 
The Boolean domain {0, 1} can be replaced by the unit interval , in which case rather than only taking values 0 or 1, any value between and including 0 and 1 can be assumed. Algebraically, negation (NOT) is replaced with  conjunction (AND) is replaced with multiplication, and disjunction (OR) is defined via De Morgan's law to be .

Interpreting these values as logical truth values yields a multi-valued logic, which forms the basis for fuzzy logic and probabilistic logic. In these interpretations, a value is interpreted as the "degree" of truth – to what extent a proposition is true, or the probability that the proposition is true.

See also
 Boolean-valued function
 GF(2)

References

Further reading
   (455 pages)  (NB. Contains extended versions of the best manuscripts from the 10th International Workshop on Boolean Problems held at the Technische Universität Bergakademie Freiberg, Germany on 2012-09-19/21.)
  (480 pages)  (NB. Contains extended versions of the best manuscripts from the 11th International Workshop on Boolean Problems held at the Technische Universität Bergakademie Freiberg, Germany on 2014-09-17/19.)
   (536 pages)  (NB. Contains extended versions of the best manuscripts from the 12th International Workshop on Boolean Problems held at the Technische Universität Bergakademie Freiberg, Germany on 2016-09-22/23.)
  (vii+265+7 pages)  (NB. Contains extended versions of the best manuscripts from the 13th International Workshop on Boolean Problems (IWSBP 2018) held in Bremen, Germany on 2018-09-19/21.)
  (204 pages)  (NB. Contains extended versions of the best manuscripts from the 14th International Workshop on Boolean Problems (IWSBP 2020) held virtually on 2020-09-24/25.)

Boolean algebra